Lingfield Park Racecourse (commonly referred to as Lingfield) is a horse racing course at Lingfield in Surrey, United Kingdom. It is owned by the ARC Racing and Leisure Group, formerly Arena Leisure Plc.

Lingfield is best known as a winter all-weather flat-racing course; the track is Polytrack, rather than the usual turf found in the UK. There are only five other all-weather courses in the UK, the others being at Southwell, Kempton, Wolverhampton, Newcastle, and Chelmsford City (formerly Great Leighs Racecourse). Lingfield stages flat racing on turf in the summer and National Hunt races are also run on turf.

Lingfield Railway Station adjoins the course, served by trains from London to East Grinstead via Oxted.

History
The racecourse is located in a  estate and was opened in 1890 by the Prince of Wales (later Edward VII), who also agreed to let Lingfield incorporate the Prince of Wales feathers into its official heading. The course initially held jumps racing only, but in 1894 the Jockey Club granted permission for flat racing to be held. Racing has been held continuously ever since, with the only exception being during World War II when the War Office requisitioned the course. After the war, the racecourse returned to its owners, the Beckwith-Smith family. The racecourse was put up for sale by the family in 1974 at a price of £500,000. A few weeks later, it was sold to Ladbrokes. Ladbrokes sold the course in 1982 and the new owners installed flood defences on the estate to alleviate the flooding that had become a major problem in the years immediately after the war. A golf course was developed and this opened in June 1987. Arena Leisure purchased the course in 1991, and in 2001 made the decision to replace the Equitrack all-weather surface with Polytrack, opening in November 2001. Other recent developments have been the re-laying of the back straight on the turf course in 2002/2003 and the construction of a £5.5 million grandstand in 2004. In early 2009 the course had another record broken as Matsunosuke became the highest rated horse to win on the all-weather surface rated 112 or 117 by Racing Post rating.  This was dubbed as the greatest all-weather horse of all time in the UK.

In addition, there's now a Marriott hotel based on the racecourse.

The racecourse is featured in the 1954 film The Rainbow Jacket.

Notable races

Other races
 Churchill Stakes
 Fleur De Lys Fillies' Stakes
 Golden Rose Stakes
 Quebec Stakes
 River Eden Fillies' Stakes
 All Weather Championship Series

References

External links
Official website
Course guide on Geegeez
Course guide on At The Races

 
Horse racing venues in England
Sports venues in Surrey
Sports venues completed in 1890
1890 establishments in England